James Peter Hrycuik (born October 7, 1949) is a Canadian former ice hockey player.  Although his National Hockey League career only lasted a total of 21 games, all with the Washington Capitals, he will always have a place in the Capitals' record books as being the one who scored the franchise's very first regular season goal on October 9, 1974 against the New York Rangers.

External links

1949 births
Living people
Canadian ice hockey centres
Ice hockey people from Saskatchewan
People from Rosthern, Saskatchewan
Undrafted National Hockey League players
Washington Capitals players